Tom Arklay (26 March 1914 – 11 January 2002) was an Australian rules footballer who played for Geelong in the Victorian Football League (VFL).

Career
A Geelong local, Arklay made his senior debut 1933. He was a tough and physical player, mostly used on the half back flank and also as a ruck rover. In both 1938 and 1940 he won Geelong's best and fairest and was a premiership player in 1937.

Arklay left the club after the 1941 VFL season which he had spent as captain. In 1944 however he made a comeback, as captain-coach before retiring at the season's end.

References

External links

1914 births
2002 deaths
Australian rules footballers from Victoria (Australia)
Geelong Football Club players
Geelong Football Club Premiership players
Geelong Football Club coaches
Carji Greeves Medal winners
North Geelong Football Club players
One-time VFL/AFL Premiership players